Puka Q'asa (Quechua puka red, q'asa mountain pass, "red mountain pass", Hispanicized spelling Pucaccasa) is a mountain in the Andes of Peru, about  high. It is situated in the Huancavelica Region, Angaraes Province, Lircay District. Puka Q'asa lies southwest of Hatun Rit'i and Wayra Q'asa, and northwest of Qiwllaqucha.

References

Mountains of Huancavelica Region
Mountains of Peru